Zone or The Zone may refer to:

Places

Climate and altitude zones
 Death zone (originally the lethal zone), altitudes above a certain point where the amount of oxygen is insufficient to sustain human life for an extended time span
 Frigid zone, a geographical zone on Earth
 Hardiness zone, a geographically defined zone in which a specific category of plant life is capable of growing
 Temperate zone, a geographical zone on Earth
 Torrid zone, a geographical zone on Earth

Military zones
 Zone, any of the divisions of France during the World War II German occupation
 Zone, any of the divisions of Germany during the post-World War II Allied occupation
DMZ or DZ or demilitarized zone, an area in which treaties or agreements between nations, military powers, or contending groups forbid military installations, activities, or personnel
 Green Zone, a military zone in Baghdad, Iraq
 Korean Demilitarized Zone

Place-names
 Administrative divisions of India, known as Zones
 Capitol Hill Autonomous Zone, commonly known as "The Zone", a self-declared commune and partially autonomous intentional community in Seattle, Washington 
 Zone (colony) (Ζώνη), an ancient Greek city
 Zone, Lombardy, a comune in the province of Brescia
 List of zones of Ethiopia, administrative divisions
 The Zone (die Zone in German), a derogatory term for the German Democratic Republic
 Zone Coopérative de l'Université Laval, a university cooperative in Quebec, Canada
 Zone of alienation, the exclusion zone around the site of the Chernobyl disaster
 Zones of Nepal, administrative divisions

Other places
 Exclusion zone, a geographic area in which certain activities are prohibited
 International zone, an extraterritorial political zone

Apparel
 Zone (vestment), a belt worn by priests and bishops of the Eastern Orthodox Church
 Zone, a girdle worn by a woman around the waist

Arts, entertainment, and media

Films
 The Zone (2003 film), a Swedish short documentary
 The Zone (2011 film), an American thriller
Transformers: Zone, a 1990 OVA

Games
 Zone (video games), an area within a virtual environment
 Zone.com, alternate name for MSN Games
 Zones, level names in early Sonic the Hedgehog games

Literature
 Zone (magazine), an Argentina-based forum for international poetry and prose
 Zone (play), a French language play written by Canadian Marcel Dubé
 "Zone", a poem by Guillaume Apollinaire
 Zones (novel), 1997, by Damien Broderick and Rorey Barns

Music

Groups and labels 
 Zone (band), an all-female J-pop group
 Zones (band), a British punk band
 Zone Records, a record label

Albums 
 Zone (album), 1996, by Southern Sons
 The Zone (album), 2007, by Enter Shikari
 Zones (album), 1983, by Hawkwind

Songs
 "Zone", a 1976 single by The Rhythm Makers
 "Zone", a 2019 single by Arizona Zervas
"Zone", a bonus track on the 2017 digital release of the Macintosh Plus album Floral Shoppe
 "The Zone" (song), a 2011 song by The Weeknd

Television
 The Zone (Australian TV program), a 1990s Australian video games news and reviews television program
 The Zone (British game show), a 2007 interactive game show
 The Zone (New Zealand TV channel), a former TV channel
 The Zone (ITV), a British teleshopping and interactive gaming TV channel
 The Zone (YTV), a Canadian television programming block

Other uses in arts, entertainment, and media
 1280 The Zone, the branding of the American radio station KZNS (AM)
A Nymph unclasping her Zone, a sculpture by Richard Westmacott
 The Zone, a fictional area in the Andrei Tarkovsky movie Stalker

Computing
 Zone, a region in region-based memory management
 DNS zone, a portion of computer network namespace
 Fibre Channel zoning, a method of network partitioning
 Solaris Zones, a virtualization feature of the Solaris operating system

Science and technology
 Zone (convex polytope), in geometry/algorithmic, a kind of convex polytope
 Brillouin zone, the primitive cell of a lattice in reciprocal space
 Chronozone, a sequence of rocks deposited within a particular time interval
 Erogenous zone, an area on the body which may respond sexually to stimulation
 Spherical zone, the surface area of a spherical segment
 Thermal zone, or just zone, in heating, ventilating, and air-conditioning (HVAC)
 Zone diet, a diet involving precise proportions by weight of protein, fat, and carbohydrate
 Zone plate, a device used to focus light or other things exhibiting wave character
 Zone System, a photographic technique for determining optimal film exposure and development

Sports
 Zone defense, in team sports
 Zoning (Australian rules football), a method of allocating players to clubs

Other uses
 Zone (guitar), a Fender bass guitar model
 Zone, a short name for DVD region code
 Zones (permaculture), a method of planning civil and agricultural placement
 Da share z0ne, a satirical social media account
 Flow (psychology), or "the zone", a mental state attained by a person fully immersed in some activity
 Time zone
 Zone pricing, based on the location of the buyer
 Zoning, in urban planning, a system of land-use regulation
 TheZone, summer camp of Oorah
 Zone (surname), surname

See also
AutoZone
Combat Zone (disambiguation)
In the Zone (disambiguation)
La Zona (disambiguation)
Zon (disambiguation)
Region (mathematics)
ZoneAlarm